The Uttara Residential Area (3rd Phase) is an extension to the Uttara Model Town in a suburb of Bangladesh's capital city.

Background
Dhaka is the capital and largest city of Bangladesh. The dwellings required to support Dhaka's large population have become inadequate. Because of this, the residential areas of Dhaka city are overpopulated and dirty.

Planned extension of the city limits is being undertaken under the Uttara Model Town Project with the objectives of accommodating the growing population and maintaining a level of service to the people. During the course of the project circa  of land were acquired. About 10,000 residential plots and 225,512 apartments including amenities and urban facilities were provided.

The entire Uttara Thana project is being undertaken by the Rajdhani Unnayan Kartripakkha (RAJUK), the Capital Development Authority of Bangladesh.

Location 
It is located on the western side of the Uttara Model Town (2nd Phase) Project. It is bounded on the south by the Mirpur Cantonment and west by the Flood Protection Embankment through Mirpur-Ashulia.

Objectives of the project 
 Reduce the pressure of population in Dhaka city by creating suburban residential accommodation
 Maintain environmental balance by proper urbanization
 Maintain an environmentally friendly and sustainable atmosphere
 Reduce the prevailing acute shortage of residential properties
 Gradually expand civic facilities by urbanization throughout the surrounding areas
 Develop new township
 Expand existing economic facilities
 Mitigate future housing demands.

Land use plan (major component) 
The following land use is planned in the project:
 Residential plots - 24.01%
 Highrise apartment block - 10.68%
 Road network - 30.92%
 Physical & social infrastructure - 3.04%
 Public utility services - 2.53%
 Lake, open space & park - 13.00%
 Neighborhood/playing field - 3.02%
 Commercial plots - 5.00%
 Central business district - 0.92%
 Education & institution - 1.67%

Condition of the project 
Site development is about 92% completed in March 2014. Site development of Sector 15 is already completed. Sectors 16 and 18 are almost complete. Sector 17 is in progress.

Road construction is in progress, with about 65% completed in March 2014. Sector 15 is currently in progress. Remaining road construction will be started shortly. Of the 12 planned bridges, 2 are almost complete and another 6 bridges are under construction. The rest of the  construction is expected to start soon.

Electricity, gas, water, and other utilities will be installed first, and other services will be introduced within the project period.

The exchange of residential plots began in January 2010 and will be completed gradually. As of March 2014, about 4,000 plots had been distributed.

Completion of the project is expected in December 2014.

References 

Urban Projects of RAJUK
Uttara
Satellite cities